Hartweg is a surname. Notable people with the surname include: 

Karl Theodor Hartweg (1812–1871), German botanist
Niklas Hartweg (born 2000), Swiss biathlete
Norman Edouard Hartweg (1904–1964), American herpetologist